The Armenian Soviet Socialist Republic, also commonly referred to as Soviet Armenia, the Armenian SSR, ArSSR, ArmSSR, or simply Armenia was one of the constituent republics of the Soviet Union in December 1922 located in the South Caucasus region of Eurasia. It was established in December 1920, when the Soviets took over control of the short-lived First Republic of Armenia, and lasted until 1991. Historians sometimes refer to it as the Second Republic of Armenia, following the demise of the First Republic.

As part of the Soviet Union, the Armenian SSR transformed from a largely agricultural hinterland to an important industrial production center, while its population almost quadrupled from around 880,000 in 1926 to 3.3 million in 1989 due to natural growth and large-scale influx of Armenian genocide survivors and their descendants. On 23 August 1990 the Declaration of Independence of Armenia was adopted. On 21 September 1991, the independence of the Republic of Armenia was confirmed in a referendum. It was recognized on 26 December 1991 with the dissolution of the Soviet Union, although the 1978 Armenian SSR Constitution, with major amendments, remained in effect until 5 July 1995 when the new Armenian constitution was adopted via referendum.

History

Sovietization

Prior to Soviet rule, the Armenian Revolutionary Federation (ARF, Dashnaksutiun) had governed the First Republic of Armenia. The Socialist Soviet Republic of Armenia was founded in 1920. Diaspora Armenians were divided about this: supporters of the nationalist Dashnaksutiun did not support the Soviet state, while supporters of the Armenian General Benevolent Union (AGBU) were more positive about the newly founded Soviet state.

From 1828, with the Treaty of Turkmenchay to the October Revolution in 1917, Eastern Armenia had been part of the Russian Empire and partly confined to the borders of the Erivan Governorate. After the October Revolution, Bolshevik leader Vladimir Lenin's government announced that minorities in the empire could pursue a course of self-determination. Following the collapse of the empire, in May 1918, Armenia, and its neighbors Azerbaijan and Georgia, declared their independence from Russian rule and each established their respective republics. After the near-annihilation of the Armenians during the Armenian genocide and the subsequent Turkish-Armenian War, the historic Armenian area in the Ottoman Empire was overrun with despair and devastation.

A number of Armenians joined the advancing 11th Soviet Red Army. Afterwards, in the treaties of Moscow and Kars, Turkey renounced its claims to Batumi to Georgia in exchange for Kars, Ardahan, and Surmalu, including the medieval Armenian capital Ani and the cultural icon of the Armenian people, Mount Ararat. Additionally, despite opposition from Armenian Bolshevik revolutionary Alexander Miasnikian, the Soviet government granted Nagorno-Karabakh and Nakhichevan to Soviet Azerbaijan, as they did not have direct control over those areas at the time and were primarily concerned with restoring regional stability.

New Economic Policy (NEP)
From 12 March 1922 to 5 December 1936, Armenia was a part of the Transcaucasian SFSR (TSFSR) together with Soviet Georgia and Soviet Azerbaijan. The policies of the first Soviet Armenian government, the Revolutionary Committee (Revkom), headed by young, inexperienced, and militant communists such as Sarkis Kasyan and Avis Nurijanian, were implemented in a highhanded manner and did not take into consideration the poor conditions of the republic and the general weariness of the people after years of conflict and civil strife. As the Soviet Armenian historian Bagrat Borian, who was to later perish during Stalin's purges, wrote in 1929:

Such was the degree and scale of the requisitioning and terror imposed by the local Cheka that in February 1921 the Armenians, led by former leaders of the republic, rose up in revolt and briefly unseated the communists in Yerevan. The Red Army, which was campaigning in Georgia at the time, returned to suppress the revolt and drove its leaders out of Armenia.

Convinced that these heavy-handed tactics were the source of the alienation of the native population to Soviet rule, in 1921, Lenin appointed Miasnikian, an experienced administrator, to carry out a more moderate policy and one better attuned to Armenian national sensibilities. With the introduction of the New Economic Policy (NEP), Armenians began to enjoy a period of relative stability. Life under Soviet rule proved to be a soothing balm in contrast to the turbulent years of the First Republic. Alexander Tamanian began to realize his city plan for Yerevan and the population received medicine, food, as well as other provisions from Moscow.

Prior to his debilitating illness, Lenin encouraged the policy of korenizatsiya or "nativization" in the republics which essentially called for the different nationalities of the Soviet Union to "administer their republics", establishing native-language schools, newspapers, and theaters. In Armenia, the Soviet government ruled that all illiterate citizens up to the age of fifty to attend school and learn to read Armenian, which became the official language of the republic. Throughout the Soviet era, the number of Armenian-language newspapers (Sovetakan Hayastan), magazines (Garun), and journals (Sovetakan Grakanutyun, Patma-Banasirakan Handes) grew. A Kurdish newspaper, Riya Teze (The New Path), was established in Armenia in 1930.

An institute for culture and history was created in 1921 in Ejmiatsin, the Yerevan Opera Theater and a dramatic theater in Yerevan were built and established in the 1920s and 1930s, and popular works in the fields of art and literature were produced by Martiros Saryan, Avetik Isahakian, and Yeghishe Charents, who all adhered to the socialist dictum of creating works "national in form, socialist in content." Armenkino released the first Armenian feature film, Namus (Honor) in 1925 and the first Kurdish film, Zare, in 1926.  Both were directed by Hamo Bek-Nazaryan, who would later direct the first sound film Pepo, released in 1935.

Stalinism and the Great Purge

The situation in Armenia and the USSR significantly changed after the death of Lenin and the rise of Joseph Stalin to the Soviet leadership. In the Caucasus, Stalin's ally in Georgia, Lavrentiy Beria, sought to consolidate his control over the region, resulting in a political struggle with Armenian First Secretary Aghasi Khanjian. The struggle culminated in Khanjian's assassination by Beria in Tiflis (Tbilisi) on 9 July 1936, beginning the Great Purge in Armenia. At first, Beria framed Khanjian's death as "suicide", but soon condemned him for abetting "rabid nationalist elements". After Khanjian's death, Beria promoted his loyalists in Armenia, Amatuni Amatuni as Armenian First Secretary and Khachik Mughdusi as chief of the Armenian NKVD. Under the command of Beria's allies, the campaign against "enemies" intensified. Expressions of "nationalism" were suspect and many leading Armenian writers, artists, scientists, and intellectuals were executed or imprisoned, including Charents, Axel Bakunts, Gurgen Mahari, Nersik Stepanyan, and others. According to Amatuni in a June 1937 letter to Stalin, 1,365 people were arrested in the ten months after the death of Khanjian, among them 900 "Dashnak-Trotskyists".

The arrest and death of Sahak Ter-Gabrielyan in August 1937 was a turning point in the repressions. When being interrogated by Mughdusi, Ter-Gabrielyan "either jumped or was thrown from" the window of the NKVD building in Yerevan. Stalin was angered that Mughdusi and Amatuni neglected to inform him about the incident. In response, in September 1937, he sent Georgy Malenkov, Mikhail Litvin, and later Anastas Mikoyan to oversee a purge of the Communist Party of Armenia. During his trip to Armenia, Mikoyan tried, but failed, to save one individual (Daniel "Danush" Shahverdyan) from being executed. More than a thousand people were arrested and seven of nine members of the Armenian Politburo were sacked from office. The trip also resulted in the appointment of a new Armenian Party leadership, headed by Grigory Arutinov, who was approved by Beria.

The Armenian Apostolic Church was not spared from the repressions. Soviet attacks against the Church under Stalin were known since 1929, but momentarily eased to improve the Soviet Union's relations with the Armenian diaspora. In 1932, Khoren I became Catholicos of All Armenians and assumed the leadership of the church. However, in the late 1930s, the Armenian NKVD, led by Mughdusi and his successor, Viktor Khvorostyan, renewed the attacks against the Church. These attacks culminated in the 1938 murder of Khoren and the closing of the Catholicate of Ejmiatsin, an act for which Beria is usually held responsible. However, the Church survived and was later revived when Stalin eased restrictions on religion at the end of World War II. In addition to the repression of the Church, tens of thousands of Armenians were executed or deported, as with various other ethnic minorities living in the Soviet Union under Stalin. In 1936, Beria and Stalin worked to deport Armenians to Siberia in an attempt to bring Armenia's population under 700,000 in order to justify an annexation into Georgia Thousands of Armenians were forcibly exiled to the Altai Krai in 1949. Many were repatriated Armenians who arrived from the Armenian diaspora.

World War II

Armenia was spared the devastation and destruction that wrought most of the western Soviet Union during the Great Patriotic War of World War II. The Wehrmacht never reached the South Caucasus, which they intended to do in order to capture the oil fields in Azerbaijan. Still, Armenia played a valuable role in the war in providing food, manpower and war material. An estimated 300–500,000 Armenians served in the war, almost half of whom did not return. Many attained the highest honor of Hero of the Soviet Union. Over sixty Armenians were promoted to the rank of general, and with an additional four eventually achieving the rank of Marshal of the Soviet Union: Ivan Bagramyan (the first non-Slavic commander to hold the position of front commander when he was assigned to be the commander of the First Baltic Front in 1943), Admiral Ivan Isakov, Hamazasp Babadzhanian, and Sergei Khudyakov. Another prominent wartime figure was Artem Mikoyan, the younger brother of Anastas and the designer and co-founder of the Soviet MiG fighter jet company.

In an effort to shore up popular support for the war effort, the Soviet government allowed for certain expressions of nationalism with the publication of Armenian novels such as Derenik Demirchian's Vardanank, the production of films like David Bek (1944), and the easing of restrictions placed against the Church. Stalin temporarily relented his attacks on religion during the war. This led to the election of bishop Gevorg in 1945 as new Catholicos Gevorg VI. He was subsequently allowed to reside in Ejmiatsin.

At the end of the war, after Germany's capitulation, the Soviet government attempted to annul the Treaty of Kars, allowing it to regain the provinces of Kars, Ardahan, Artvin, and Surmalu. On 7 June 1945, Soviet Foreign Minister Vyacheslav Molotov informed the Turkish ambassador in Moscow that the disputed provinces should be returned to Soviet Union in the name of both the Armenian and Georgian Soviet Republics. Turkey itself was in no condition to fight a war with the Soviet Union, which had emerged as a superpower after the Second World War. The Soviet territorial claims were supported by the Armenian Catholicos and by all shades of the Armenian diaspora, including the anti-Soviet Dashnaksutiun. However, with the onset of the Cold War, especially the Truman Doctrine in 1947, Turkey strengthened its ties with the West. The Soviet Union relinquished its claims over the lost territories, and Ankara joined the anti-Soviet NATO military alliance in 1952.

Armenian immigration

With the republic suffering heavy losses after the war, Stalin allowed an open immigration policy in Armenia; the diaspora were invited to repatriate to Armenia (nergaght) and revitalize the country's population and bolster its workforce. Armenians living in countries such as Cyprus, France, Greece, Iraq, Lebanon, and Syria were primarily the survivors or the descendants of the genocide. They were offered the option of having their expenses paid by the Soviet government for their trip back to their homeland. An estimated 150,000 Armenians immigrated to Soviet Armenia between 1946 and 1948 and settled in Yerevan, Leninakan, Kirovakan and other towns.

Lured by numerous incentives such as food coupons, better housing and other benefits, they were received coldly by the Armenians living in the Republic upon their arrival. The repatriates spoke the Western Armenian dialect, instead of the Eastern Armenian spoken in Soviet Armenia. They were often addressed as aghbars ("brothers") by Armenians living in the republic, due to their different pronunciation of the word. Although initially used in humor, the word went on to carry on a more pejorative connotation. Their treatment by the Soviet government was not much better. A number of Armenian immigrants in 1946 had their belongings confiscated upon arrival at Odessa's port, as they had taken with them everything they had, including clothes and jewelry. This was the first disappointment experienced by Armenians; however, as there was no possibility of return the Armenians were forced to continue their journey to Armenia. Many of the immigrants were targeted by Soviet intelligence agencies and the Ministry of Interior for real or perceived ties to Armenian nationalist organizations, and were later sent to labor camps in Siberia and elsewhere, where they would not be released until after Stalin's death. Some who were suspected of being Dashnak party members were targeted for deportation to Central Asia in 1949.

Khrushchev Thaw
Following the power struggle after Stalin's death in 1953, Nikita Khrushchev emerged as the country's new leader. In his "secret" speech "On the Cult of Personality and Its Consequences" that he delivered before the 20th Congress of the Soviet Communist Party in 1956, Khrushchev sharply denounced Stalin and his crimes. During the subsequent Khrushchev Thaw, the Soviet leadership largely loosened political restrictions and put more resources into housing and consumer goods.

Almost immediately, Armenia underwent a cultural and economic rebirth. Religious freedom, to a limited degree, was granted to Armenia when Catholicos Vazgen I assumed the duties of his office in 1955. One of Khrushchev's advisers and close friends, Armenian Politburo member Anastas Mikoyan, urged Armenians to reaffirm their national identity. In March 1954, two years before Khrushchev denounced Stalin, Mikoyan gave a speech in Yerevan where he encouraged the republication of Raffi and Raphael Patkanian, the rehabilitation of Charents, and the revival of the memory of Miasnikian. Behind the scenes, he assisted Soviet Armenian leaders in the rehabilitation of former "enemies" in the republic. The massive statue of Stalin that towered over Yerevan was pulled down from its pedestal by troops literally overnight in 1962 and replaced in 1967 with that of Mother Armenia. Contacts between Armenia and the Diaspora were revived, and Armenians from abroad began to visit the republic more frequently. The Matenadaran, a facility to house ancient and medieval manuscripts was erected in 1959, and important historical studies were prepared by a new cadre of Soviet-trained scholars.

Mikoyan was not the only Armenian figure who rose to prominence during this era. Other famed Soviet Armenians included composers Aram Khachaturian, Arno Babajanian, Konstantin Orbelyan, and Tigran Mansurian; scientists Viktor Hambardzumyan and Artem Alikhanyan; actors Armen Dzhigarkhanyan and Frunzik Mkrtchyan; filmmakers Frunze Dovlatyan, Henrik Malyan, Sergei Parajanov, and Artavazd Peleshyan; artists Minas Avetisyan, Yervand Kochar, Hakob Kojoyan, and Tereza Mirzoyan; singers Georgi Minasyan, Raisa Mkrtchyan, and Ruben Matevosyan; and writers Silva Kaputikyan, Sero Khanzadyan, Hrant Matevosyan, Paruyr Sevak, and Hovhannes Shiraz, among many others.

Brezhnev era

After Leonid Brezhnev assumed power in 1964, many of Khrushchev's reforms were curtailed. However, although the Soviet state remained ever wary of the resurgence of Armenian nationalism, it did not impose the sort of restrictions as were seen during Stalin's time. On 24 April 1965, thousands of Armenians demonstrated in the streets of Yerevan during the fiftieth anniversary of the Armenian genocide. In the aftermath of these demonstrations, the memorial in honor of the victims of the genocide was completed at the Tsitsernakaberd hill above the Hrazdan gorge in Yerevan in 1967. Monuments in honor of other important events in Armenian history, such as that commemorating the Sardarapat and Bash Abaran, were also permitted to be erected, as was the sculpting of the statues of popular Armenian figures like the fifth-century military commander Vardan Mamikonian and the folk hero David of Sassoun.

The Brezhnev era also saw the rise of the shadow economy and corruption. Materials allocated for the building of new homes, such as cement and concrete, were diverted for other uses. Bribery and a lack of oversight saw the construction of shoddily built and weakly supported apartment buildings. The impact of such developments was to be demonstrated several years later in the catastrophic earthquake that hit Spitak. When the earthquake hit on the morning of 7 December 1988, the houses and apartments least able to resist collapse were those built during the Brezhnev years. Ironically, the older the dwellings, the better they withstood the quake. Armenian First Secretary Karen Demirchyan assumed office with a mandate to combat these abuses.

Glasnost and perestroika

 
Mikhail Gorbachev's introduction of the reforms of glasnost and perestroika in the 1980s fueled Armenian visions of a better life under Soviet rule. Armenians in Nagorno-Karabakh, which was promised to Armenia by the Bolsheviks but transferred to Soviet Azerbaijan, began a movement to unite the area with Armenia. The majority Armenian population expressed concern about the forced "Azerification" of the region. On February 20, 1988, the Supreme Soviet of the Nagorno-Karabakh Autonomous Oblast voted to unify with Armenia.

Demonstrations took place in Yerevan in support of the Karabakh Armenians, and grew into what became known as the Karabakh movement. By the beginning of 1988, nearly one million Armenians from several regions of the republic engaged in these demonstrations, centered on Yerevan's Theater Square (currently Freedom Square). However, in neighboring Azerbaijan, violence against Armenians erupted in the city of Sumgait. Ethnic rioting soon broke out between Armenians and Azeris, preventing any peaceful resolution from taking place. Armenians became increasingly disillusioned with the Kremlin's response toward the issue. Gorbachev, who had until then been viewed favorably in Armenia, saw his standing among Armenians deteriorate significantly.

Tension between the central government in Moscow and the local government in Yerevan heightened in the final years of the Soviet Union. The reasons largely stemmed from Moscow's perceived indecision on Karabakh, ongoing difficulties with earthquake relief, and the shortcomings of the Soviet economy. On August 23, 1990, the Supreme Soviet of the Armenian SSR adopted the Declaration of Independence of Armenia, declaring the Republic of Armenia to be a subject of international law. On 17 March 1991, Armenia, along with the Baltics, Georgia and Moldova, boycotted the union-wide referendum in which 78% of all voters voted for the retention of the Soviet Union in a reformed form. Armenia confirmed its independence in a referendum on 21 September 1991 after the unsuccessful coup attempt in Moscow by the CPSU hardliners. 

The republic's independence became official with the Belovezh Accords and the formal dissolution of the Soviet state on December 26, 1991, making Armenia a sovereign independent state on the international stage. The constitution of the Armenian SSR of 1978 remained in effect until July 5, 1995 when the Constitution of Armenia was adopted.

Politics

Government

The structure of government in the Armenian SSR was identical to that of the other Soviet republics. The First Secretary was the administrative head of the republic, and the head of government was the Chairman of the Council of Ministers. The republic's legislative body was the Armenian Supreme Soviet, which included the highest judicial branch of the republic, the supreme court. Members of the Supreme Soviet served for a term of five years, whereas regional deputies served for two and a half years. All officials holding office were mandated to be members of the Communist Party and sessions were convened in the Supreme Soviet building in Yerevan.

The administrative divisions of the Armenian SSR from 1930 consisted of up 37 raions and 22 city districts. After the dissolution of the Soviet Union in 1991, these were abolished in 1995 and replaced by larger marzer ("provinces").

Depending on the historical period, Soviet authorities would variously tolerate, co-opt, undermine, or sometimes even attempt to eliminate certain currents within Armenian society, such as nationalism and religion, to strengthen the cohesiveness of the Union. In the eyes of early Soviet policymakers, Armenians, along with Russians, Ukrainians, Belarusians, Georgians, Germans, and Jews were deemed "advanced" (as opposed to "backward") peoples, and were grouped together with Western nationalities. The Caucasus and particularly Armenia were recognized by academic scholars and in Soviet textbooks as the "oldest civilisation on the territory" of the Soviet Union.

Like all the other republics of the Soviet Union, Armenia had its own flag and coat of arms. According to Nikita Khrushchev, the latter became a source of dispute between the Soviet Union and Turkey in the 1950s, when Ankara objected to the inclusion of Mount Ararat, which holds a deep symbolic importance for Armenians but is located on Turkish territory, in the coat of arms. Turkey felt that the presence of such an image implied Soviet designs on Turkish territory. Khrushchev retorted by asking, "Why do you have a moon depicted on your flag? After all, the moon doesn't belong to Turkey, not even half the moon ... Do you want to take over the whole universe?" Turkey dropped the issue after this.

Participation in international organizations
The Armenian SSR, as a Soviet republic, was internationally recognized by the United Nations as part of the Soviet Union but it had Norair Sisakian as President of the 21st session of the UNESCO General Conference in 1964. The Soviet Union was also a member of Comecon, Warsaw Pact and the International Olympic Committee.

Military forces
The military forces of the Armenian SSR were provided by the Soviet Army's 7th Guards Combined Arms Army of the Transcaucasian Military District. It was organized into the following:
 HQ of the 7th Guards Combined Arms Army - Yerevan
15th Motor Rifle Division, Kirovakan
127th Motor Rifle Division, Leninakan (today the Russian 102nd Military Base)
164th Motor Rifle Division, Yerevan
7th Fortified Area, Leninakan
9th Fortified Area, Ejmiatsin

Economy

Under the Soviet system, the centralized economy of the republic banned private ownership of income-producing property. Beginning in the late 1920s, privately owned farms in Armenia were collectivized and placed under the directive of the state, although this was often met with active resistance by the peasantry. During the same time (1929–1936), the government also began the process of industrialization in Armenia.
Republic's economic foundation is the socialist system of economy and the socialist ownership of the means of production, which has two forms: state property and cooperative and collective-farm property. In addition to the socialist system of economy, which is the predominant form of economy in the Republic, the law permits small private undertakings of individual peasants and handicraftsmen based on their own labor and precluding exploitation of the labor of others. The economic life of the Republic is determined and guided by the state economic plan.
By 1935, the gross product of agriculture was 132% of that of 1928 and the gross product of industry was 650% to that of 1928. The economic revolution of the 1930s, however, came at a great cost: it broke up the traditional peasant family and village institution and forced many living in the rural countryside to settle in urban areas. Private enterprise came to a virtual end as it was effectively brought under government control.

Culture

Literature
Lazare Indjeyans Les Années volées and Armand Maloumians Les Fils du Goulag are two repatriate narratives about being incarcerated and eventual escape from gulags. Many other repatriate narratives explore family memories of the genocide and the decision to resettle in the Soviet Union. Some writers compare the 1949 Soviet deportations to Central Asia and Siberia with earlier Ottoman deportations.

Notes

References

Further reading 
 Aghayan, Tsatur., et al. (eds.), Հայ Ժողովրդի Պատմություն [History of the Armenian People], vols. 7 and 8. Yerevan: Armenian Academy of Sciences, 1967, 1970.
 Armenian Soviet Encyclopedia. Yerevan: Armenian Academy of Sciences, 1974–1987, 12 volumes.
 Aslanyan, A. A. et al. Soviet Armenia. Moscow: Progress Publishers, 1971.
 Geghamyan, Gurgen M. Սոցիալ-տնտեսական փոփոխությունները Հայաստանում ՆԵՊ-ի տարիներին (1921-1936) [Socio-Economic Changes in the Armenia during the NEP Years, (1921-1936)]. Yerevan: Armenian Academy of Sciences, 1978. 
Matossian, Mary Kilbourne. The Impact of Soviet Policies in Armenia. Leiden: E.J. Brill, 1962.
Miller, Donald E. and Lorna Touryan Miller, Armenia: Portraits of Survival and Hope. Berkeley: University of California Press, 2003.
Shaginian [Shahinyan], Marietta S. Journey through Soviet Armenia. Moscow: Foreign Languages Publishing House, 1954. 
Suny, Ronald Grigor. "Soviet Armenia," in The Armenian People From Ancient to Modern Times, Volume II: Foreign Dominion to Statehood: The Fifteenth Century to the Twentieth Century, ed. Richard G. Hovannisian, New York: St. Martin's Press, 1997.
 Virabyan, Amatuni. Հայաստանը Ստալինից մինչև Խրուշչով: Հասարակական-քաղաքական կյանքը 1945-1957 թթ. [Armenia from Stalin to Khrushchev: Social-political life, 1945-1957] Yerevan: Gitutyun Publishing, 2001.
Walker, Christopher J. Armenia: The Survival of a Nation. London: Palgrave Macmillan, 1990.
Yeghenian, Aghavnie Y. The Red Flag at Ararat. New York: The Womans Press, 1932.  Republished by the Gomidas Institute in London, 2013.

External links 

Armenia: big strides in an ancient land by Anton Kochinyan

 
Former socialist republics
Republics of the Soviet Union
Communism in Armenia
States and territories established in 1920
States and territories disestablished in 1991
1920 establishments in Russia
1991 disestablishments in the Soviet Union